Sentimental poetry is a melodramatic poetic form. It is aimed primarily at stimulating the emotions rather than at communicating experience truthfully. Bereavement is a common theme of sentimental poetry. 

Friedrich Schiller discussed sentimental poetry in his influential essay, On Naïve and Sentimental Poetry.

A sentimental poet is described as "He who plays off the amiable in verse, and writes to display his own fine feelings" in Poetical Moods and Tenses.

Romantic poetry is rooted in and springs from sentimental. Charlotte Turner Smith is the first poet in England to be called romantic.  Her poetry illustrates the common ground of sentimental and romantic as well as their differential qualities.

Sara Teasdale was praised for her lyrical mastery and romantic subjects.  During World War I she wrote several poems regarding sentiments of the war but never published them.  When she shared one poem with critic Louis Untermeyer and poet John Meyers O'Hara, they cautioned her against publishing it.  But she did publish Union Square although did not publicly share the sentiments she wrote of.

Sentimental poetry was parodied by Mark Twain in The Adventures of Huckleberry Finn.

References

See also
Sentimental novel
Sentimentalism
Sentimentality

Aesthetics
Genres of poetry